NASL Final 1971 was the championship series of the 1971 season. It was contested as a best-of-three series between the Dallas Tornado and the Atlanta Chiefs. The matches were held on September 9, 15, and 19, 1971. Games one and three were played at Atlanta Stadium, in Atlanta, Georgia.  Game two was played at Franklin Stadium of Hillcrest High School in Dallas. A combined 14,361 people attended the three game series. The Chiefs won game one, while the Tornado won games two and three to claim their first NASL championship.

Background 
The Dallas Tornado qualified for the playoffs by virtue of having the highest non-division-winning point total in the league (119 points). They defeated the defending league champion Rochester Lancers in a marathon semifinal series, two games to one, that featured two of the longest games ever played in the history of soccer. Game 1 lasted a record 176 minutes and Game 3 lasted 148 minutes.

The Atlanta Chiefs road to the finals was a bit smoother than their opponents' path. They qualified for the playoffs by winning the Southern Division with 120 points. The Chiefs then defeated the New York Cosmos in the semifinals, two games to none without conceding a goal.

Series summary 

Notes

Match details

First leg

Second leg

Playoff 

 

1971 NASL Champions: Dallas Tornado

See also 
 1971 North American Soccer League season

References

External links
 

1971
 
1971
September 1971 sports events in the United States
1971 in sports in Georgia (U.S. state)
1971 in sports in Texas
1970s in Atlanta
1970s in Dallas
Atlanta Chiefs matches
Sports competitions in Atlanta
Sports competitions in Dallas
Soccer in Georgia (U.S. state)
Soccer in Texas